Takahiro Wada (born 16 November 1971) is a Japanese former wrestler who competed in the 1996 Summer Olympics and in the 2000 Summer Olympics.

References

External links
 

1971 births
Living people
Olympic wrestlers of Japan
Wrestlers at the 1996 Summer Olympics
Wrestlers at the 2000 Summer Olympics
Japanese male sport wrestlers
Asian Games medalists in wrestling
Wrestlers at the 1994 Asian Games
Medalists at the 1998 Asian Games
Asian Games gold medalists for Japan
20th-century Japanese people
21st-century Japanese people
World Wrestling Championships medalists